Cedric Wallace (August 3, 1909 in Miami, Florida – August 19, 1985 in New York City) was an American jazz double-bassist.

Wallace moved to New York City in the 1930s, where he played in a band led by Reggie Johnson at the Saratoga Club. Later in the decade he worked with Jimmie Lunceford before joining Fats Waller's band from 1938-1942, the association for which he is best known. Wallace played with Waller at the peak of his popularity and plays on many of his biggest hits. He also recorded with Una Mae Carlisle, Maxine Sullivan, Champion Jack Dupree, Pat Flowers, Gene Sedric, and Dean Martin. He led his own ensemble in New York in the 1940s which featured Eddie Gibbs on bass for a time, and continued to perform into the 1970s.

References
Chris Kelsey, [ Chris Kelsey] at Allmusic

1909 births
1985 deaths
American jazz double-bassists
Male double-bassists
Musicians from Florida
20th-century American musicians
20th-century double-bassists
20th-century American male musicians
American male jazz musicians